The Louth County Board of the Gaelic Athletic Association (GAA) or Louth GAA is one of the 32 county boards of the GAA in Ireland, and is responsible for Gaelic games in County Louth.  The county board is also responsible for the Louth county teams.

County Board Chairpersons

The officials who have chaired the Louth GAA board since the establishment of the Gaelic Athletic Association are named below. 

Elections for Chairperson as well as other positions take place at the board's annual convention and are held at headquarters in Darver. The maximum term under current county board rules is five years for any position.

The current incumbent, Clan Na Gael's Peter Fitzpatrick  T.D., is a former player and captain of the county football team. He also managed the team from 2010-12, the highlight of his tenure being Louth's first appearance in a Leinster Senior Football Championship Final for 50 years in  2010.

Crest

In 2010, the Drogheda Gaelic football club, O'Raghallaigh's, tabled a motion for convention calling for the Boyne Valley Cable Bridge symbol to be removed from the Louth GAA crest because of the bridge's main location being in the neighbouring county of Meath; this led to the county crest being changed to a simpler version.

Ógspórt Lú
Ógspórt Lú is the organisation in County Louth for the promotion of Gaelic Games and Activities among young children.

Its approach is new and innovative, concentrating on maximum participation, skill development and the inculcation of best practice.

It was founded in 2007 following a consultative process that identified the need for a new beginning and a system that would provide a solid foundation for the future development of Gaelic games in Louth.

Football

Clubs

Clubs contest the Louth Senior Football Championship. That competition's most successful club is Newtown Blues, with 23 titles.

Dundalk Young Irelands are the county's and country's oldest GAA club. Dundalk Young Irelands represented the county in the first All Ireland Football final which was played at Beech Hill on 29 April 1888 against the Limerick Commercials.

County team

The earliest recorded inter-county football match took place in 1712 when Louth faced Meath at Slane. A fragment of a poem from 1806 records a football match between Louth and Fermanagh at Inniskeen, Co Monaghan.

When Louth GAA sent the team into training in Dundalk for the 1913 Croke Memorial replay under a soccer trainer from Belfast, the move caused more than a ripple through the Association. For thirty years full-time training in bursts of a week or so before a big match were common. After that the two or three times a week gatherings became more popular.

Between 1945 and 1953 Louth and Meath met 13 times. The crowds got bigger and bigger each time as they played draw after draw in the Championship. The attendance of 42,858 at a thrilling 1951 replay remained a record for a provincial match other than a final for forty years the four match series between Meath and Dublin in 1991. The rivalry with Meath has never fizzled out, as witnessed by a stirring Leinster semi-final in 1998. Nor has controversy, as witnessed by Graham Geraghty's "wide" 45th minute point. 
In 1957 showband star Dermot O'Brien was late for the All-Ireland final and joined the team when the parade was completed. Prior to the game O'Brien had captained the side in the semi final success, when the regular captain Patsy Coleman had been injured. Both Ardee men tossed a coin to see who would captain the team. O'Brien won the toss. Coleman today still has the match ball.  O'Brien played a key role as Louth beat Cork with the help of a goal from Sean Cunningham with five minutes to go. Dermot O'Brien died on 21 May 2007.
As both Cork and Louth wear Red and White, on that day Louth wore the green of Leinster, while Cork wore the blue of Munster.

Eamonn McEneaney was manager from 2006 to 2009 and guided them to their most recent success, the O'Byrne Cup when they defeated DCU in the 2009 final played in the Gaelic Grounds in Drogheda.

On 27 June 2010, Louth reached their first Leinster Senior Championship Final in 50 years. During the Leinster Final on 11 July that year, anger and controversy erupted when, during the 74th minute of the match against Meath, a goal was awarded by the referee after brief consultation with only one of the match umpires (although close circuit camera evidence shown on the RTÉ Two coverage of the game proved that the ball was carried over the line by a Meath player). However, Meath received the 2010 Leinster Title and the cup. Louth have been represented by two players in the International Rules Series versus Australia in recent years, Paddy Keenan and Ciarán Byrne.

Hurling
Clubs contest the Louth Senior Hurling Championship. That competition's most successful club is Naomh Moninne, with 22 titles.

The Louth hurling team competes in the Nicky Rackard Cup, an extension of the All-Ireland Senior Hurling Championship. The Louth hurlers finished as runner-up to London in the 2005 final at Croke Park, and to Sligo in 2008. In 2016, they competed in the Lory Meagher Cup, defeating Sligo in the final 4-15 to 4-11, and Fermanagh in the 2020 final by 2-19 to 2-08.

Louth won the 2022 Lory Meagher Cup to become the first team to win that competition on three occasions.

Louth has the following achievements in hurling.

 All-Ireland Junior Hurling Championship: 1976, 1977
 Lory Meagher Cup: 2016, 2020, 2022
 Leinster Junior Hurling Championship: 1968, 1969, 1973
 National Hurling League Div. 3: 2000, 2008. 1967 first national hurling league title beating mayo in final , Div 3 ...

Aidan Kerrigan from Ballyoughter, County Wexford has worked with the Louth senior hurling team.

Camogie
Louth contested two All Ireland senior finals in 1934 and 1936, captained by Rose Quigley from Darver, where Fr Tom Soraghan was zealously promoting the game. Kathleen and Nan Hegarty two of her Darver team-mates were leading players of the decade.

Notable players include junior player of the year winner in 1982 Vivienne Kelly.

Under Camogie's National Development Plan 2010-2015, "Our Game, Our Passion", Carlow, Cavan, Laois, Louth and Roscommon were to get a total of 17 new clubs by 2015.

Louth have the following achievements in camogie.

All-Ireland Senior Camogie Championship runners-up: 1934, 1936

Ladies' football
Louth has a ladies' football team.

Further reading

References

External links

 Louth on Hoganstand.com
 National and provincial titles won by Louth teams
 Louth GAA site

 
Gaelic games governing bodies in Leinster
Leinster GAA
Sport in County Louth